Adam Elliot, (baptised 19 December 1802, – died 4 June 1878), was a British Church of England missionary who ministered to First Nations tribes in Ontario, Canada.

External links
Biography at the Dictionary of Canadian Biography Online

References

1802 births
1878 deaths
English Anglican missionaries
Anglican missionaries in Canada
19th-century English Anglican priests